Duke Eugen of Württemberg may refer to:

Duke Eugen of Württemberg (1758–1822), third son of Frederick II Eugene, Duke of Württemberg
Duke Eugen of Württemberg (1788–1857), eldest son of the above
Duke Eugen of Württemberg (1820–1875), second child and first son of the above
Duke Eugen of Württemberg (1846–1877), second child and only son of the above